Moshrageh (also Romanized as Moshrāgeh, Meshrāgeh, and Moshārageh; also known as Moshāregheh) is a city & capital of Moshrageh District, Moshrageh Rural District, Ramshir County, Khuzestan Province, Iran. At the 2006 census, its population was 947, in 171 families.

References 

Populated places in Ramshir County
Cities in Khuzestan Province